This is a videography for American rock band Widespread Panic. Widespread Panic formed in Athens, GA in 1986, and soon became known for their live shows. The band has since released 14 videos showcasing these performances.

Videos

References 

http://widespreadpanic.com/videography.php

External links 
 Widespread Panic Videography

Videographies of American artists